ELTA may mean one of the following:

Broadcasting
 ELTA 1 HD, the first commercial HD cable television channel in Bosnia and Herzegovina
 ELTA 2, a commercial music television channel in Bosnia and Herzegovina
 , a television channel in Taiwan

Other
 Elta Systems Ltd, an Israeli provider of defense products and services specializing in C4ISTAR products
 Elta (river), a river of Baden-Württemberg, Germany
 ELTA, a Lithuanian news agency
 Hellenic Post (abbreviated ΕΛΤΑ, ELTA), state-owned provider of postal services in Greece
 Elta-Kabel, a Bosnian cable television company based in Doboj